In karst geology, estavelle or inversac is a ground orifice which, depending on weather conditions and season, can serve either as a sink or as a source of fresh water. It is a type of ponor or sinkhole.

References

Karst
Cave geology
Dinaric karst formations
Dinaric Alps